Ade Kannu is a 1985 Indian Kannada-language psychological thriller film directed by Chi. Dattaraj. It stars Dr. Rajkumar and Gayathri. Dr. Rajkumar appeared in a dual role for the last time in his career, and this was the last movie in which Gayathri appeared in a lead role against Dr. Rajkumar.

Plot
Jagannath Rao is the rich owner of the Kamala coffee estate, ably supported by his friend Mahesh. He had earlier joined the estate in the position of the manager, falling in love with Mahesh's sister Kamala and eventually marrying her and begetting a son Gopinath aka Gopi, who is a car rally enthusiast. When Gopi is away participating in a rally, he receives a telegram that his mother is seriously ill and reaches home only to find out that she met with a car accident and has been buried. He finds it hard to believe this, as his mother was an excellent driver herself, and the one who taught him how to drive a car. There are no convincing answers on what happened from either Mahesh or from the household cook Ramayya.

As days pass, Jagannath Rao gets increasingly depressed at Kamala's death, and becomes a recluse.  Gopi is unable to understand what his father is really worrying about. Eventually, a Inspector Shridhar arrives at the estate, stating that he has been deputed to investigate Kamala's death, and that her death may not be a car crash after all. The turquoise-coloured cat-like eyes of Sridhar scares Jagannath, who begins to have hallucinations of those eyes repeatedly. Sridhar keeps visiting from time to time and befriends Gopi as well, but Jagannath gets more and more strange in his behavior and becomes a recluse.

One day, Ramayya goes missing and Sridhar too gets killed in an accident. During this time, Gopi meets with an accident too, and loses his eyesight, and Sridhar's eyes are transplanted to him. When Gopi returns home, Jagannath just cannot bear to look at him, and becomes increasingly unstable and delirious whenever he sees the eyes of Gopi. Eventually, Gopi reveals that he used coloured contact lenses to get his father to open up as to why he is so scared of the eyes. It is then revealed that during an argument with Kamala, Jagannath had slapped her, and died from internal hemorrhage. They place her body in the car and push it over the cliff to prevent anyone from knowing. It is also revealed that Jagannath had killed Ramayya as well as Sridhar. Unable to manage the situation in guilt for a situation he cannot manage. Jagannath loses his sanity and commits suicide by driving over the cliff.

Cast
 Dr. Rajkumar as Jagannath Rao & Gopi
 Gayathri as Kamala 
 Thoogudeepa Srinivas as Mahesh
 Satish as Inspector
 Shivaprakash
 Sudheer
 Vijayaranjini as Sujatha
 Uma Shivakumar as Sarala
 Bhatti Mahadevappa as Ramayya, A Cook in Jagannath Rao's House
 Vadiraj

Soundtrack
The music and background score was composed by G. K. Venkatesh and the lyrics were penned by Chi. Udaya Shankar.

References

External links
 

1985 films
1980s Kannada-language films
Films scored by G. K. Venkatesh
Indian psychological thriller films
Films with screenplays by Chi. Udayashankar
1985 thriller films
Films directed by Chi. Dattaraj